Bulawayo Athletic Club is a sports club in Bulawayo, Zimbabwe. The Bulawayo Athletic Club Ground is the 12,000-capacity stadium.

History

The club was founded in 1894. Cricket is the main sport played at the club, but tennis, bowls, squash and billiards are also played. It has also been a significant venue for many international sporting events. 

On 12 August 2007, a fire broke out at the club, destroying the members' bar area and billiards rooms and causing damages of up to US$400,000. The Walkden Hall, the squash courts and the changing rooms were saved from the blaze. The fire was believed to have been started by an electrical fault.

At the Hockey Africa Cup of Champions held in Bulawayo in 2014, the Bulawayo Athletic Club ladies team reached the competition's final. Two Bulawayo Athletic Club players were in the gold medal winning Zimbabwe ladies hockey team at the 1980 Summer Olympics in Moscow, Patricia McKillop and Helen Volk.

As a cricket venue

In the summer of 1992, the Zimbabwe national cricket team was granted Test status. Shortly afterwards, Bulawayo Athletic Club hosted one Test match (becoming the country's second Test venue, after Harare Sports Club) and one One Day International, with New Zealand the visitors in both.

New Zealand won the ODI, on 31 October, by 22 runs. The Test began the following day, but was badly hit by rain and a lack of adequate covering, with ten hours of play lost. In addition, the wicket was poor, as were the attendances (1,000 on the first day and a few hundred each day thereafter). Thus, when international cricket returned to Bulawayo, it was played at the nearby Queens Sports Club.

Bulawayo Athletic Club continued to host domestic matches, and along with Queens Sports Club served as a home ground for the Matabeleland team.

International Centuries

Test Centuries
Only 2 Test centuries have been scored at the venue.

One Day International Centuries
Only 1 One Day International centuries have been scored at the venue.

List of Five Wicket Hauls

Tests
Only one five wicket haul in Test matches have been taken at the venue.

See also
 List of Test cricket grounds
 One-Test wonder

References

External links

 brmtaylor.com Club Players
 ESPNcricinfo page on Bulawayo Athletic Club
 CricketArchive page on Bulawayo Athletic Club
 Zimbabwe Cricket

Cricket grounds in Zimbabwe
Test cricket grounds in Zimbabwe
Sport in Bulawayo